Chloe, also spelled Chloë, Chlöe, or Chloé, is a feminine name meaning "blooming" or "fertility" in Greek. The name ultimately derives, through Greek, from the Proto-Indo-European root , which relates to the colors yellow and green. The common scientific prefix chloro- (e.g. chlorine and chloroplast) derives from the same Greek root. In Greek the word refers to the young, green foliage or shoots of plants in spring.

 was one of the many epithets of the goddess Demeter. The name appears in the New Testament, in 1 Corinthians 1:11 in the context of "the house of Chloe", a leading early Christian woman in Corinth, Greece. The French spelling is Chloé.

Popularity 
The name was a popular Ancient Greek girl's name (cf. the Ancient Greek novel Daphnis and Chloe) and remains a popular Greek name today.

It has been a very popular name in the United Kingdom since the early 1990s, peaking in popularity later in the 1990s and during the first decade of the 21st century.

In Northern Ireland, Chloe was the most popular name for newborn girls from 1997 to 2002, followed by Emma in 2003. It was also one of the most popular girls' names throughout the UK from 1995 to 2002. In 2013, it was the fourth-most popular name for baby girls in Australia.

Chloe was among the five most popular names for newborn girls of Asian descent in the American state of Virginia in 2022. it has ranked among the top one hundred names for newborn American girls nationally since 1998, peaking in 2009 and 2010 when it was the ninth most popular name given to girls. It was the twenty-fourth most popular name for American girls nationally in 2021. The name is occasionally misspelled as Chole. The United States Social Security Administration noted that a number of parents of girls initially named Chole on their birth certificates had filed to correct the spelling to Chloe between 2017 and 2022.

People 
 Chloë (Australian singer) (Chloë Stafford), Australian singer
 Chloë Agnew (born 1989), Irish singer and the youngest member of Celtic Woman
 Chloe Alper (born 1981), English singer and bass player for the band Pure Reason Revolution
 Chloë Annett (born 1971), British actress
 Chloe Ashcroft (born 1942), British TV presenter
 Chloe Bailey (born 1998), known mononymously as Chlöe, an American singer, songwriter, actress, record producer, and part of the duo Chloe x Halle
 Chloe Bennet (born 1992), Chinese-American actress and singer
 Chloe Bridges (born 1991), American actress, singer and pianist
 Chloe Brockett (born 2000), English television personality
 Chloe Dao (born 1972), fashion designer and television personality
 Chloe Fineman (born 1988), American actress, writer, and comedian
 Chloé Georges (born 1980), a French acrobatic skier
 Chloé Graftiaux (1987–2010), a Belgian sport climber
 Chloë Hanslip (born 1987), British violinist
 Chloé Hayden (born 1997), Australian actress and author.
 Chloé Hollings, French-Australian actress
 Chloe Hooper (born 1973), Australian author
 Chlöe Howl (born 4 March 1995), British singer-songwriter
Chloe Ing (born 1998), Singaporean figure skater
 Chloe Jones (1975–2005), American model and pornographic actress
 Khloé Alexandra Kardashian, American reality TV star
 Chloé Katz (born 1986), an American figure skater
 Chloe Kelly (born 1998), English footballer
 Chloe Kim (born 2000), American snowboarder
 Chloé Lambert (born 1976). French actress
 Chloe Latimer (born 1996), Scottish singer and songwriter
 Chloé Leriche, Canadian filmmaker
 Chloe Rose Lattanzi (born 1986), American actress and singer
 Chloe Logarzo (born 1994), Australian footballer
 Chloe Lowery (born 1987), American singer
 Chloe Lukasiak (born 2001), American dancer and actress
 Chloe Marshall (born 1991), British plus-size model
 Chloe Maxmin, American politician
 Chloe Meecham (born 1999), South African water polo player
 Chloë Grace Moretz (born 1997), American actress
 Chloe Moriondo (born 2002), American singer-songwriter and YouTuber
 Chloe Moss (born 1976), British playwright
 Chloe Ann O'Neil (born 1943), New York politician
 Chloe Rogers (born 1985), English field hockey player
 Chloe Saavedra (born 1994), founding member of the music group Chaos Chaos (formerly Smoosh)
 Chloé Sainte-Marie (born 1962), a French Canadian actress and singer
 Chloë Sevigny (born 1974), American actress
 Chloe Smith (born 1982), British Conservative Party politician
 Chloe Smith (musician), American folk musician and activist
 Chloe Sutton (born 1992), American swimmer
 Chlöe Swarbrick (born 1994), New Zealand politician and entrepreneur.
 Chloe Temtchine, American singer-songwriter
 Chloe Ting (born 1986), Australian YouTuber
 Chloe Webb (born 1956), American actress
 Chloe Ardelia Wofford, birth name of Toni Morrison (1931-2019), American author, editor and professor
 Chloé Zhao (born 1982), Chinese filmmaker

Fictional characters
 Chloe, in Mozart's song "An Chloe"
 Chloe, a chihuahua in the movie Beverly Hills Chihuahua
 Chloe, in Atom Egoyan's 2009 film Chloe
 Chloe, a character in the play Daphnis and Chloe by ancient Greek novelist Longus
 Chloe, fictional character from the movie Deep Impact
 Chloe, fictional character from Don't Trust the B---- in Apartment 23
 Chloe, the heroine of the poem The Fable of the Bees by Bernard Mandeville
 Chloe, a character in Froth on the Daydream by Boris Vian
 Chloé, a character in Éric Rohmer's 1972 film Love in the Afternoon
 Chloé, a character in the French television series Madeline
 Chloe, in the Noir anime television series
 Chloe, in the operetta Orpheus in the Underworld by Jacques Offenbach
 Chloe, in the comic opera Princess Ida by Gilbert and Sullivan
 Chloe, in the novel Sleepovers by Jacqueline Wilson
 Chloe, in the novel S.N.U.F.F. by Victor Pelevin
 Chloe, fictional character from the TV series The Tribe
 Aunt Chloe, in the novel Uncle Tom's Cabin by Harriet Beecher Stowe;
 Lucky Chloe, fictional character from the video game series Tekken
 Chloe, co-protagonist of Glitter Force
 Chloe Armstrong, in the television series Stargate Universe
 Chloe Beale, from the Pitch Perfect movie franchise
 Chloé Bourgeois (character), from the animated TV series Miraculous: Tales of Ladybug & Cat Noir
 Chloe Branagh, a character from Young Dracula
 Chloe Brennan, in the soap opera One Life to Live
 Chloe Cammeniti, in the Australian soap opera Neighbours
 Chloe Carmichael, a new fictional character from The Fairly OddParents
 Chloe Carter, on Harper's Island
Chloe Cerise, in the Japanese anime Pokémon
 Chlo Charles, in the BBC television series Waterloo Road
 Chloe Corbin, in PBS Kids Sprout programme Chloe's Closet
 Chloe Decker, in the television series Lucifer
 Chloe Flan, a character from Sabrina: The Animated Series
 Chloe Frazer, from the video game Uncharted franchise
 Khloe Gomez, a character from He's Into Her
 Chloe Harris, from Emmerdale
 Chloe James, from Dog With a Blog
 Chloe Jones, in the television series A Country Practice;
 Chloe King, in the 2011 American television series The Nine Lives of Chloe King
 Chloe Lane, in the television series Days Of Our Lives
 Chloe Mitchell, in the American soap opera The Young and the Restless
 Chloe O'Brian, in the television series 24
 Chloe Payne, in the television series Mercy
 Chloe Park, in the television series We Bare Bears
 Chloe Pig, in the British television series Peppa Pig
 Chloe Price, fictional character from the video game Life Is Strange
 Chloe Pye, a fictional actress and dancer in the 1937 mystery novel, Dancers in Mourning by Margery Allingham
 Chlöe Rice, a character in the Netflix series 13 Reasons Why
 Chloe Richards, in the Australian soap Home and Away
 Chloe Saunders, in Kelley Armstrong's Darkest Powers trilogy
 Chloe Simon, in Disney's 102 Dalmatians
 Chloe Steele, in the Left Behind series
 Chloe Stilton, in the animated Horseland series
 Chloe Sullivan, in the television series Smallville
 Chloe Talbot, in the television series The Simpsons
 Chloe the Topaz Fairy, in the book franchise Rainbow Magic
 Chloe Valens, in the video game Tales of Legendia
 Chloe Wheeler, in the television series Coming of Age

See also

Notes

References 

French feminine given names
Greek feminine given names
English feminine given names
Welsh feminine given names
Scottish feminine given names
Irish feminine given names
Epithets of Demeter